Mihai Bravu (an alternate Romanian name for Michael the Brave) may refer to several places in Romania:

 Mihai Bravu, Giurgiu, a commune in Giurgiu County
 Mihai Bravu, Tulcea, a commune in Tulcea County
 Mihai Bravu, a village in Roșiori Commune, Bihor County
 Mihai Bravu, a village in Victoria Commune, Brăila County
 Mihai Bravu metro station, Bucharest